Ipur is a village in Palnadu district of the Indian state of Andhra Pradesh. It is the headquarters of Ipur mandal in Narasaraopet revenue division.

Geography 

Governance 
Ipur gram panchayat is the local self-government of the village. It is divided into wards and each ward is represented by a ward member.first mla is ksr

Education 

As per the school information report for the academic year 2018–19, the village has 10 schools. These include one KGBV, one model, 2 private and 6 Zilla/Mandal Parishad schools.

See also 
List of villages in Guntur district

References 

Villages in Guntur district
Mandal headquarters in Guntur district